Wik-Ngatharr, or Wik-Alken (Wik-Elken), is a Paman language spoken on the Cape York Peninsula of Queensland, Australia, by the Wik-Ngatharr people. It is a co-dialect with Wik-Ngathan, and more distantly related to the other Wik languages. In 1981 there were 86 speakers.

References 

Wik languages